Mount Lamlam (meaning lightning in Chamoru) is a peak on the United States island of Guam. It is located near the village of Agat ( north), in the south-west of the island.

See also
List of mountain peaks of the United States
List of U.S. states by elevation

References

 Bendure, G. & Friary, N. (1988) Micronesia:A travel survival kit. South Yarra, VIC: Lonely Planet.

External links 
 "Mount Lamlam". PeakBagger.com
 "Mount LamLam". SummitPost.org

National Natural Landmarks in Guam
Mountains of Guam